The John and Fredricka (Roth) Stern Homestead near Mott, North Dakota, United States, was listed on the National Register of Historic Places in 2008.

The homestead has German-Russian homestead architecture and was built by John Stern in 1905.  It is two miles east of Mott on North Dakota Highway 21.  Tours of the site have been sponsored by the Mott Gallery of History and Art.

References

Farms on the National Register of Historic Places in North Dakota
National Register of Historic Places in Hettinger County, North Dakota
German-Russian culture in North Dakota
Tourist attractions in Hettinger County, North Dakota